The following organizations, individuals, and media outlets (including newspapers) have endorsed parties and or candidates in the 2006 Canadian federal election:

Endorsements by party

See also
 Newspaper endorsements in the Canadian federal election, 2006

Sources 
 CBC: "Canada Votes" Endorsements

2006 Canadian federal election
Federal election, 2006